Leonid Oleksandrovych Musin (born 19 April 1985) is a Ukrainian former footballer who played as a goalkeeper. He also holds Russian citizenship.

He represented Ukraine at the 2002 UEFA European Under-17 Football Championship.

See also
 2005 FIFA World Youth Championship squads#Ukraine

External links
 Player page by the Russian Premier League 
 
 
 

1985 births
Footballers from Moscow
Living people
Russian footballers
Ukrainian footballers
Association football goalkeepers
Ukraine under-21 international footballers
Ukraine youth international footballers
Ukrainian expatriate footballers
Expatriate footballers in Belarus
Expatriate footballers in Russia
Expatriate footballers in Poland
FC Dynamo Kyiv players
FC Borysfen-2 Boryspil players
FC Dynamo-2 Kyiv players
FC Dynamo-3 Kyiv players
FC Poltava players
FC Dinamo Minsk players
FC Oleksandriya players
FC Anzhi Makhachkala players
FC Ural Yekaterinburg players
FC Orenburg players
FC Tyumen players
Górnik Wałbrzych players
FC Solyaris Moscow players
Belarusian Premier League players
FC Olimp-Dolgoprudny players